Pinba is the free high-performance real-time statistic and monitoring server for PHP with MySQL read-only interface developed for highloaded websites by Badoo Development. Available for download under GNU GPL license.

Pinba receives all the statistical data from numerous PHP threads through UDP protocol. It allows not to affect overall performance of PHP scripts on high loaded production servers. Pinba developers states that it is not a debugging tool, since in general it's a bad idea to debug on productions servers, but a tool to discover bottlenecks in the code of real running product with ability to count errors, warnings, overall execution time and other important data.

Reports generated by Pinba server can be further processed to output human-readable reports for developers or even be collected by charts tools like RRD or Munin. It produces to types of reports: common data like execution time of every script, CPU and memory consumption, transferred data size, etc.; users counters data, which can be places anywhere in the code of PHP product.

The gathered data is rotated and truncated - statistics should be used as soon as possible to generate fresh reports.

Developers 
 Andrei Nigmatulin - initial design, first implementation
 Alexey Rybak - design and ideas
 Antony Dovgal - current implementation

See also 

 Comparison of network monitoring systems
 Network monitoring
 System monitor

External links 
 Official website Pinba.org
 Documentation
 Dotdeb.org: "Let’s monitor your PHP applications with Pinba"

Free network management software
Internet Protocol based network software